Nationality words link to articles with information on the nation's poetry or literature (for instance, Irish or France).

Events

 February 2 — Leigh Hunt released from prison after being jailed for criticizing the Prince Regent in The Examiner.
 May — North American Review founded in Boston, Massachusetts.
 September — Lord Byron writes Samuel Taylor Coleridge of his admiration of Christabel, which he has heard recited by Walter Scott; Coleridge sends Byron a copy of the poem, and after reading it Byron realizes he has unconsciously borrowed from it in Siege of Corinth; he offers to omit the lines; yet on publication the lines remain and Byron offers an explanatory note.
 Percy Bysshe Shelley writes Alastor, or The Spirit of Solitude which lacks a title when he passes it along to his friend, Thomas Love Peacock. Peacock suggests the name "Alastor" from Roman mythology.
 First complete publication of the Old English epic poem Beowulf, in a Latin translation by Icelandic-Danish scholar Grímur Jónsson Thorkelin.

Works published

United Kingdom
 Lord Byron, Hebrew Melodies, including "She Walks in Beauty", "The Destruction of Sennacherib" published in April with musical settings; though expensive at a cost of one guinea, over 10,000 copies sell; by summer, an edition of Byron's poems without the musical settings is published.
 Louisa Costello, The Maid of the Cyprus Isle, and Other Poems
 William Cowper (pronounced "Cooper"), Poems, by William Cowper, edited by John Johnson
 James Hogg, The Pilgrims of the Sun
 Leigh Hunt, The Descent of Liberty: A masque
 Ann Radcliffe, Poems
 Walter Scott:
 "The Lord of the Isles"
 The Field of Waterloo (the Battle of Waterloo took place on June 18)
 Lydia Sigourney, Moral Pieces in Prose and Verse, United States
 Robert Southey, The Minor Poems of Robert Southey, a reprinting of Poems 1796 and Metrical Tales 1805
 William Wordsworth:
 Poems, including a revised version of "I Wandered Lonely as a Cloud" and Lyrical Ballads (published separately in 1798, 1800, 1802, 1805); a third volume published in 1820
 The White Doe of Rylstone; or, The Fate of the Nortons

United States
 Hugh Henry Brackenridge, Modern Chivalry: Containing the Adventures of a Captain, and Teague O'Regan, his Servant, United States
 William Cullen Bryant, "To a Waterfowl", a widely popular and much anthologized poem in which the narrator's doubt and uncertainty is relieved by seeing a bird flying alone across the sky, inspiring belief in the guidance of God; later published in The North American Review in March 1818; Matthew Arnold called it "the best short poem in the language"
 Philip Freneau, A Collection of Poems on American Affairs, two volumes of previously unpublished verses reflecting strong patriotism; released during the War of 1812
 Lydia Sigourney, Moral Pieces in Prose and Verse, the author's first published book

Other
 Ang Duong, "Neang Kakey", Cambodian verse melodrama composed in Thailand
 Theodor Körner (died 1813), Poetischer Nachlass, Germany

Births
Death years link to the corresponding "[year] in poetry" article:
 March 29 – Hagiwara Hiromichi 萩原広道 (died 1863), Japanese late-Edo period scholar of literature, philology and nativist studies (Kokugaku); also author, translator and poet; known for his commentary and literary analysis of The Tale of Genji
 October 29 – Dan Emmett (died 1904), American songwriter
 December 30 – Betty Paoli, born Barbara "Babette" Elisabeth Glück (died 1894), Austrian poet
Meenakshi Sundaram Pillai (died 1876), Tamil scholar and poet

Deaths
Birth years link to the corresponding "[year] in poetry" article:
 January 21 – Matthias Claudius (born 1740), German poet
 April 10 – George Ellis (born 1753) English antiquarian and poet
 June – Elizabeth Hands (born 1746), English poet
 December 29 – Samuel Henley (born 1740), English clergyman, schoolteacher, college principal, antiquarian, writer and poet

See also

 Poetry
 List of years in poetry
 List of years in literature
 19th century in literature
 19th century in poetry
 Romantic poetry
 Golden Age of Russian Poetry (1800–1850)
 Weimar Classicism period in Germany, commonly considered to have begun in 1788  and to have ended either in 1805, with the death of Friedrich Schiller, or 1832, with the death of Goethe
 List of poets

Notes

Poetry
19th-century poetry